Greg Stevenson (born 27 February 1969) is a Canadian rower. He competed at the 1992 Summer Olympics and the 1996 Summer Olympics.

References

External links
 

1969 births
Living people
Canadian male rowers
Olympic rowers of Canada
Rowers at the 1992 Summer Olympics
Rowers at the 1996 Summer Olympics
Sportspeople from Sherbrooke
Pan American Games medalists in rowing
Pan American Games silver medalists for Canada
Rowers at the 1995 Pan American Games